The OneVoice Movement, founded in 2002, is a global initiative that supports grassroots activists in Israel, Palestine, and internationally who are working to build the human infrastructure needed to create the necessary conditions for a just and negotiated resolution to the Israeli–Palestinian conflict.

OneVoice's programming is centered in the United States and Europe, aimed at creating the international conditions necessary for a just and lasting peace. Additionally, OneVoice supports the work of regional partners based in Tel Aviv and Ramallah, who are working to reverse rising trends of extremism within both societies and empower moderates to reclaim national narratives.

Overview 
OneVoice's work is predicated on a vision of an independent and viable Palestine and a secure Israel free from conflict, where Palestinians and Israelis are able to realize their national and individual aspirations, building a future based upon principles of security, justice, dignity and peace. OneVoice believes that a negotiated and permanent solution to the Israeli–Palestinian conflict and an end to occupation is not only a moral imperative, but an existential priority for both societies.

OneVoice works with regional partners in Israel and Palestine who are similarly committed to nonviolent conflict resolution and reversing trends of polarization and extremism, building a social context upon which a solution can be agreed upon and implemented. Simultaneously, OneVoice carries out programs catered to the international community, running highly visible, sustained programming to educate and engage communities, reducing and eliminating Islamophobia, anti-Semitism and all forms of racism from the Israeli–Palestinian discourse.

Approach 
OneVoice is unique because it takes a comprehensive approach to resolving the conflict. In Israel and Palestine, it supports partners on the ground who empower grassroots activists and the next generation of change-makers. Recognizing that the conflict has regional and international dimensions, and that events on the ground have severe global consequences, OneVoice also facilitates programs and advocacy efforts internationally to galvanize and shape a broad coalition—spanning different faiths and crossing ideological and political lines—that can reduce polarization and hate, and demonstrate one strong and coherent voice for resolving the conflict through nonviolent means. Their broad array of partnerships has led to criticism, as some authors consider their chosen partners disreputable.

History 
OneVoice was founded by entrepreneur Daniel Lubetzky in the spring of 2002 in the wake of the failure at the 2000 Camp David Summit and renewed violence between Israelis and Palestinians. OneVoice emerged from Lubetzky's previous venture, Peaceworks, Inc., on the principle that economic cooperation between Israelis and Palestinians would result in stronger relations. OneVoice was to be a forum for moderate Israelis and Palestinians to express themselves and their desires for peace through a negotiated two-state solution.

OneVoice began as a citizen negotiations platform before embracing grassroots training and mass mobilization. Its Youth Leadership Program, established in 2004, trains Israelis and Palestinians ages 18–35 on conflict resolution, public speaking, political knowledge, and leadership development. Under the executive leadership of Samer Makhlouf over OneVoice Palestine and Tal Harris over OneVoice Israel, more than 6,000 participants have been trained and took part in youth-led initiatives to date.

Under Makhlouf and Harris and the global leadership of former USAID Director to West Bank and Gaza, Dr. Howard Sumka, and former US Ambassador to Morocco Marc Ginsburg, OneVoice also engaged in several campaigns in the late 2000s to mobilize the Israeli and Palestinian grassroots and gage public opinion on the two-state solution and end to the conflict.

OneVoice Israel co-founded the first caucus in the Israeli Knesset that supports ending the conflict via a two-state solution, and OneVoice Palestine supported the PLO's quest for statehood at the United Nations General Assembly through an extensive town-hall meeting program throughout the West Bank.

OneVoice initiated the establishment of the Knesset Caucus to End the Arab-Israeli conflict, which organized an historic meeting between the Knesset members and President Abbas, a visit by Palestinian legislators to the Knesset, and the February 16, 2014 visit to the Mukataa by 300 Israeli students.

More recently, OneVoice’s focus is challenging the hopelessness and apathy prevalent in Israeli and Palestinian societies by activating their network of volunteers through new initiatives, empowering individuals to take personal responsibility to end the occupation, and providing concrete, tangible facts on why ending the conflict is beneficial to their bottom lines.

Programs and campaigns

One Million Voices (2007) 
Throughout 2007, OneVoice challenged Israelis and Palestinians to ask "What Are You Willing to Do to End the Conflict?" at the World Economic Forum in Davos, Switzerland, OneVoice Youth Leaders presented video statements from Tel Aviv,  Jerusalem, and Ramallah on the campaign to 2,000 dignitaries. Attendees included Palestinian President Mahmoud Abbas, then-Israeli Foreign Minister Tzipi Livni, and then-Israeli Vice-Premier Shimon Peres.

Later that November, OneVoice led a delegation to the Annapolis Conference to express the support of the overwhelming majority of Israelis and Palestinians for the two-state solution and to demonstrate solidarity with the leaderships as they committed to reaching an agreement within one year. OneVoice launched a 365-day countdown clock for civic action and installed 11 digital screens – five in Ramallah and six in Tel Aviv – displaying countdown clocks set for one year: one year to end the occupation, one year to achieve an independent Palestinian state at peace with Israel, one year to end the violence and the conflict, and one year for citizens to take a stand in support of the negotiations.

Imagine 2018 (2008-2011) 
"Imagine: 2018" sought to transform apathy into inspiration among average Israelis and Palestinians by asking them to visualize what the region would look like in 10 years if a peace agreement were signed.

In cooperation with the Palestinian and Israeli ministries of education, OneVoice launched an essay contest in classrooms throughout Israel and the West Bank. From 2,500 submissions, winning essays were chosen on their potential to inspire citizens to build a future based on two states for two peoples. OneVoice asked leading Israeli, Palestinian, and Hollywood filmmakers to select one essay as the inspiration for a 1–5 minute short film. The "Boy and Soldier" and "Palestine International Airport" were among the winners of the contest, while "Israel & Palestine to Co-Host World Cup in 2018?" went viral.

At the end of the contest, OneVoice Israel received third prize in the Effie Awards’ non-profit organizations category, and the most creative and provocative essays from "Imagine 2018" were published in Hebrew and Arabic and disseminated to dozens of top Israeli and Palestinian leaders.

Saying What Needs to Be Said (2009–2010) 
OneVoice partnered with experts in public opinion polling from Israel, Palestine, and the international community to develop an iterative methodology to gauge public opinion as well as engage the public in crafting a consensus on the issues at the core final status issues. Using the results of the poll, OneVoice launched a series of town hall meetings across Israel and Palestine, revealing the often private views of the majority in each society and demonstrating that there was a partner on the other side despite the recent violence.

I.M.P.A.C.T. and O&E 
I.M.P.A.C.T. (Informing and Mobilizing Political Actors, Communities, and Thinkers), formally the International Engagement Program (IEP), works to build relationships with policy makers, influential communities, and thought leaders to foster an environment for a larger contingent of American citizenry to be informed of OneVoice's peace efforts through community events, private individual meetings, conference participation, and delegations to Israel and Palestine.

The Outreach and Education Program (O&E) has delivered conflict resolution training to schools and universities and has facilitated community discussions on the conflict in the United Kingdom and Western Europe since 2011. It has engaged thousands of people in London, Birmingham, and Manchester through community, school, university, and religious outreach. O&E holds an annual summer residential program to empower outstanding UK students interesting in ending the conflict.

Peace, It Also Pays Off and shekel campaigns (2014) 
"Peace, It Also Pays Off" was a OneVoice Israel campaign that reminded Israelis of the economic consequences of continuing the conflict and occupation at the expense of social and economic programs. The campaign asked Israelis to consider how they would rather spend 32 billion shekels—the amount the conflict costs Israel each year.

The data used for the social media and grassroots elements of the campaigns was based on analysis from Netanya College, the Molad Center, and the Adva Center. "Peace, It Also Pays Off" highlighted the positive impact an agreement with the Palestinians will have on the daily economic issues Israelis care about most—from affordable housing to food prices, from the job market to healthcare.

Prior to "Peace, It Also Pays Off," OVI reacted to the January announcement of 1,400 settlement units with  a campaign to urge Finance Minister Yair Lapid to back up his rhetorical support for peace with real action—ending financial transfers to the settlements and sending the money instead to deprived communities inside Israel. OneVoice Israel activists distributed 10,000 shekel notes with Lapid's face, and called on him to stop financial transfers for settlement construction. This grassroots outreach was paired with an aggressive social media campaign, juxtaposing Lapid's public comments in support of negotiations with a call to back those pledges with action.

Wake Up! What is Your Role? (2013–2014) 
"Wake Up: What is Your Role?" seeks to mobilize the Palestinian mainstream to embrace their national responsibilities and support the Palestinian negotiators to secure an independent state. OneVoice Palestine kicked off the campaign with a 1,000 meter banner unveiling in the Jordan Valley in November 2013.

The "Wake Up" campaign was composed of youth initiatives, town hall meetings, political roundtables, and issue-based discussions. OVP also partnered with Wattan TV to broadcast debates on taboo and sensitive topics around the West Bank, and OVP youth leaders took part in radio shows to explain why they joined the movement and how their work is beneficial to the Palestinian cause. "Wake Up: What is Your Role?" aimed to break the state of apathy about negotiations and demonstrate that non-violent resistance can be successful in securing Palestinian rights while connecting everyday Palestinians to their leaders.

V15 (2015) 
In 2015, OneVoice supported V15, also known as Victory 15, a group which sought to replace Israeli governmental leadership in the 2015 Israeli legislative election, although without advocating for a particular candidate or party. In February 2015, the United States Senate Homeland Security Permanent Subcommittee on Investigations, Committee on Homeland Security and Governmental Affairs, began an inquiry to determine what connection, if any, existed between a United States State Department grant of more than $300,000 to OneVoice and its subsequent involvement with V15. In July 2016, the Subcommittee's report was published, concluding that "OneVoice Israel's conduct fully complied with the terms of its agreements with the State Department and governing grant guidelines" and that "the Subcommittee found no evidence that OneVoice spent grant funds to influence the 2015 Israeli elections." However, in the Subcommittee's report also stated that State Department "failed to take any steps to guard against the risk that OneVoice could engage in political activities using State-funded grassroots campaign infrastructure after the grant period" when OneVoice deployed in Israel its social media platform, "which more than doubled during the State Department grant period."

Criticism 
OneVoice has been criticized for claiming their preferred process, peaceful negotiations toward a two-state outcome, are representative of a "silent majority", when survey data on Palestinian preferences do not reveal such a clear majority.

See also 
 Israeli–Palestinian conflict

References

External links 
 Official site
 New York Times interviews Ezeldeen Masri, OneVoice Palestine-Gaza, April 16,2014

Non-governmental organizations involved in the Israeli–Palestinian peace process
Organizations established in 2002
Organizations based in New York City